Tarna is a village in Ardino Municipality, Kardzhali Province, southern-central Bulgaria. It covers an area of 2.458 square kilometres and as of 2013 had a population of 42 people.

References

Villages in Kardzhali Province